'Travis Hanson' is a rally car driver who competes in the Rally America national rally series across the United States. He is a vehicle dynamics engineer and an instructor with the Team O’Neil Rally School in New Hampshire. he is from Traverse City, MI, but he and team call both Michigan and New Hampshire home as they split a lot of time between the two cities. He is the only driver to win a race outright with a non-open class car.

Complete Rally America results

References

External links
 Travis Hanson's Official Website
 Travis Hanson's ESPN Profile
 Travis Hanson's ESPN Profile

Year of birth missing (living people)
Living people
American rally drivers